Baltasar Berenguer Hervas (October 15, 1911 – September 2, 1992), popularly known in his time as Baltasar Sangchili, was a Spanish boxer who claimed the World Bantamweight Championship. He was the first Spanish fighter in history to win a world championship in boxing. During his illustrious career, he defeated many great fighters including "Panama" Al Brown, Tony Marino, Victor "Young" Perez, Maurice Dubois, Ronnie James, Nicolas Petit-Biquet, Maurice Dubois, Eugène Huat, Carlos Flix and Joseph David.

Boxing career
Sangchili was born in Valencia, Spain on October 15, 1911. When he started his boxing career, to prevent his father from learning of his travels, Baltasar Belenguer took the name of his Chinese partner and friend Chang-Chi-Li (Shang-Chi-Li). Sangchili later told his team: "From now on I want to announce myself as Sangchili Baltasar..."

Before winning the World title, he engaged in 60 fights, and emerged victorious in 50 of them with five defeats. He defeated Carlos Flix to claim the Bantamweight Championship of Spain. He made two attempts to conquer the Bantamweight Championship of Europe against Nicolas Petit-Biquet which ended in draws. In his second attempt, he was defeated in their rematch by a 15-round decision.

He defeated former IBU and NBA Flyweight champion, Victor "Young" Perez on points in 10 rounds in Madrid.

World Bantamweight Championship
On March 18, 1935, Sangchili got his chance to fight reigning World Bantamweight champion Panama Al Brown which ended in a draw but Sangchili won their rematch in a points decision. Once he gained the title, he made successful tours garnering many victories both in Spain and abroad, without putting his title on the line until the veteran Benny Sharkey with over one hundred victories defeated him in Newcastle, England. One month later, he recovered from his defeat against Sharkey by defeating another great opponent, Ronnie James in Liverpool.  James had won over fifty fights with only one defeat. On February 10, 1936, he made his debut in the United States, defeating Jimmy Martin and Lew Farber in New York City.

On June 29, 1936 in a bout at New York's Madison Square Garden, against Tony Marino, Sangchili put his title at stake and was knocked out in 14th round, though Sangchili held a points advantage through much of the bout. In October of the same year, Sangchili got his revenge on Marino, defeating him by points in 10 rounds, though the bout was not for the title.

Sangchili ended his North American tour with a defeat in Mexico against local boxer Juan Zurita and returned to Europe where he made several battles in France in the next two years. He fought former champion Panama Al Brown for the third time for the vacant IBU Bantamweight Championship of the World. The fight was held in Paris and this time Brown won in a fifteen-round points decision.

He ended his career in 1940 by taking the national Bantamweight Championship of Spain against Miguel Safont in a twelve-round points decision. He ended his career with a record of 77 wins with 37 knockouts, 20 losses and 12 draws. He died in September 1992.

Professional boxing record

See also
 List of Bantamweight boxing champions
 List of The Ring world champions#Bantamweight

References

External links
 Baltasar Sangchili Profile
 Baltasar Sangchili - CBZ Profile

|-

1911 births
1992 deaths
Bantamweight boxers
Spanish male boxers